The Royal Victoria Yacht Club is located along the shores of Cadboro Bay in The Uplands a neighborhood of Oak Bay, adjacent to the city of Victoria, British Columbia, Canada, and has facilities at Tseheum Harbour in Sidney.

History
The Royal Victoria Yacht Club was formed on June 8, 1892, and moved in 1912 to its current location, at the location of the old Hudson's Bay Company cattle wharf. The Royal Victoria Yacht Club is the oldest yacht club in British Columbia.

Through the years, the club has hosted a number of regattas and sailing races, including a racing program for young sailors

References

External links

 Royal Victoria Yacht Club

Royal yacht clubs
Yacht clubs in Canada